Nicolás Leiva is an Argentine rugby union player who plays for the Jaguares. On 2 January 2018, Leiva was named in the Jaguares squad for the 2018 Super Rugby season.

References

External links
 itsrugby Profile

Jaguares (Super Rugby) players
Rugby union props
Argentine rugby union players
Living people
Hindú Club players
Year of birth missing (living people)